José Manuel Forbs, known as Forbs (born 15 August 1963) is a former Bissau-Guinean football player. He also holds Portuguese citizenship.

He played 11 seasons and 260 games and scored 52 goals in the Primeira Liga for Braga, Portimonense, Sporting and Boavista.

Club career
He made his Primeira Liga debut for Sporting on 26 August 1984 as a late substitute in a 3–0 victory over Vitória de Guimarães.

References

1963 births
Sportspeople from Setúbal
Living people
Bissau-Guinean footballers
Sporting CP footballers
Bissau-Guinean expatriate footballers
Expatriate footballers in Portugal
Primeira Liga players
Portimonense S.C. players
Boavista F.C. players
S.C. Braga players
F.C. Penafiel players
Liga Portugal 2 players
F.C. Tirsense players
Association football forwards